Nyarrin is a locality in Victoria, Australia, located approximately 59 km from Ouyen, Victoria.

Nyarrin Post Office opened on 2 November 1914 when the railway arrived, and closed in 1970.

References

Towns in Victoria (Australia)